McCormack Motorsports is a former Indy Racing League team owned by Dennis McCormack that operated from 1996 to 2001. Based in Avon, Indiana, the team debuted at the 1996 Indianapolis 500 with a car for Randy Tolsma, however, it failed to make the field. For the 1996–1997 season, the team used 3 different drivers. Raul Boesel drove the entire 1998 season for the team and finished 20th in points with a best finish of 8th. 1999 was another season of instability as the team saw 4 different drivers start a race for them and one other driver, Nick Firestone, fail to get his McCormack entry into the Indy 500.  2000 again saw 3 different drivers drive for the team and relative instability and lack of funding, along with two of its cars, this time driven by Ronnie Johncox and Robby Unser again fail to qualify for the Indy 500. This was largely due to a disastrous experiment with using the uncommon Riley & Scott chassis. The team also formed an alliance with the Byrd brothers of Byrd Motorsports and fielded the #30 car for a revolving door of drivers including Johncox, Jon Herb, and J. J. Yeley.  2001 was the team's final season. The team shut down after its car driven by Brandon Erwin failed to qualify for the Indy 500 and then the next week at the Casino Magic 500, where they were woefully off the pace. The team's best finish was a 5th place by Boesel at the 1999 Indy 200 at Walt Disney World Speedway.

Drivers
 Raul Boesel (1998–1999)
 Brandon Erwin (2001)
 Robbie Groff (1997)
 Jon Herb (2000)*
 Ronnie Johncox (2000)*
 Jimmy Kite (1999)
 Willy T. Ribbs (1999)
 Jeret Schroeder (1997)
 Robby Unser (2000)
 Stan Wattles (1997)
 J. J. Yeley (2000)*

*indicates the driver was entered as Byrd-McCormack Motorsports

Complete IRL IndyCar Series results
(key) (Results in bold indicate pole position; results in italics indicate fastest lap)

 1 The 1999 VisionAire 500K at Charlotte was cancelled after 79 laps due to spectator fatalities.

References 

1996 establishments in the United States
2001 disestablishments in the United States
American auto racing teams
IndyCar Series teams